Canton of Champtoceaux is a former canton of France, located in the Maine-et-Loire department, in the Pays de la Loire region. It had 15,824 inhabitants (2012). It was disbanded following the French canton reorganisation which came into effect in March 2015. It consisted of 9 communes, which joined the canton of La Pommeraye in 2015.

Communes
The canton comprised the following communes:

 Champtoceaux
 Bouzillé
 Drain
 Landemont
 Liré 
 Saint-Christophe-la-Couperie
 Saint-Laurent-des-Autels
 Saint-Sauveur-de-Landemont
 La Varenne

See also 
 Arrondissement of Cholet
 Cantons of the Maine-et-Loire department
 Communes of the Maine-et-Loire department

References

Former cantons of Maine-et-Loire
2015 disestablishments in France
States and territories disestablished in 2015